The Savages is a British sitcom that aired on BBC One in 2001. Starring Geoffrey Palmer and comedian Marcus Brigstocke, it was written by Simon Nye, the writer of Men Behaving Badly.

The Savages revolves around the Savage family, with Geoffrey Palmer playing grandfather Donald, Marcus Brigstocke his son Adam and Victoria Hamilton as Adam's wife Jessica. The programme aired for only one series. The song "Days" by the Kinks was used as its theme song

Cast
Marcus Brigstocke – Adam Savage
Victoria Hamilton – Jessica Savage
Geoffrey Palmer – Donald Savage
Liberty Morris – Nicola Savage
Jake Fitzgerald – Luke Savage
Gresby Nash – Mark Savage

Plot
Adam, a successful cartoonist with a strip in a national newspaper, and Jessica Savage, who works at a travel agents, are a modern young couple. They work too hard, they argue occasionally, they bicker a lot, and they are stressed out, but their relationship is kept together by affection. Their hyperactive young children, six-year-old Nicola and three-year-old Luke, are both destructive. Adam's retired and vague father, Donald, lives nearby on his own, after his wife walked out on him. Adam also has a brother called Mark.

Episodes
Each episode aired on BBC One on Tuesdays and is thirty minutes long. The first few episodes aired at 9.00pm, the later ones at 9.30pm.

Broadcast worldwide
In 2008, The Savages was broadcast on various PBS stations across the United States as part of the "One Season Wonders" strand.

References

External links 
 

2001 British television series debuts
2001 British television series endings
2000s British sitcoms
BBC television sitcoms
Television series by Hartswood Films